Methylorosula is a Gram-negative genus of bacteria from the family of Beijerinckiaceae, with one known species (Methylorosula polaris).

References

Further reading 
 

Bacteria genera
Monotypic bacteria genera
Beijerinckiaceae